Jorrel Hato (born 7 March 2006) is a Dutch footballer who plays as a central defender for Ajax and Jong Ajax.

Early life
Born in Rotterdam, Hato moved from his hometown club Sparta Rotterdam to Ajax in 2018.

Club career

Ajax

2022: Jong Ajax debut
In March 2022 Hato signed a contract keeping him with Ajax until July 2025 despite interest from other European clubs. As captain of the Ajax youth team in the UEFA Youth League he scored a heralded solo goal running from centre back in the 87th minute to secure a 1–1 draw with Napoli in October 2022. He was included in a Eerste Divisie match day squad for Jong Ajax for the first time on 4 November 2022 away against FC Dordrecht and made his debut as a second half substitute.

2023 Ajax debut
On 11 January 2023, Hato made his senior debut for Ajax in the KNVB Cup against Den Bosch appearing as a second half substitute for his side in a 2–0 win. On 5 February 2023, he made his Eredivisie debut for Ajax as a substitute in a 5–0 win away against SC Cambuur, becoming the third youngest player to debut for Ajax in the Eredivisie at the age of 16 years and 335 days, behind Ryan Gravenberch and Clarence Seedorf. Shortly afterwards, on 10 February 2023, he scored his first senior professional goal away against FC Den Bosch.

International career
Born in the Netherlands, Hato is of Curaçaoan descent. In November 2021, he was included in the Dutch under-16 squad. He became captain of the under-16 Dutch team in 2022.

References

External links

2006 births
Living people
Footballers from Rotterdam
Dutch footballers
Netherlands youth international footballers
Dutch people of Curaçao descent
Association football defenders
Association football central defenders
Jong Ajax players
AFC Ajax players
Eredivisie players
Eerste Divisie players